Jean Leclercq may refer to:
Jean Leclercq (monk) (1911–1993), Benedictine monk and author 
Jean Leclercq (politician) (1925–1970), Belgian politician and Walloon militant

See also
 Jean Leclerc (disambiguation)